A Ghost Is Born is the fifth studio album by American alternative rock band Wilco. Released on June 22, 2004, it features singer Jeff Tweedy on lead guitar more than any previous Wilco album. The band streamed the album online free, and offered a five-song EP to purchasers.

Tweedy entered a rehab clinic shortly before the release of the album, delaying its release by two weeks. It also shortened its promotional tour. Despite this, A Ghost Is Borns opening week was the best sales week for the band at the time and the album was met with good reviews from major publications such as Rolling Stone and PopMatters. The album earned Wilco a Grammy Award for Best Alternative Music Album.

Production
Wilco signed a contract with Nonesuch Records in November 2001 after a lengthy dispute with Reprise Records over the release of the band's fourth album Yankee Hotel Foxtrot. Foxtrot was welcomed with positive reviews from The Village Voice—where the album was rated by the critics as the best album of 2002—and Rolling Stone. It sold over 590,000 copies, earning a Gold certification by the Recording Industry Association of America. Last accessed July 27, 2007.

Composition
Recording for a new album began in November 2003 under the working title Wilco Happens. The album was produced by Jim O'Rourke, who mixed Foxtrot and was a member of Wilco side project Loose Fur. O'Rourke encouraged lead singer Jeff Tweedy to develop his guitar skills for the album; Tweedy recently became the lead guitarist for the band due to the dismissal of Jay Bennett after the Yankee Hotel Foxtrot recording sessions. Tweedy sought to play solos on the album that were unlike those of jam bands such as Phish and The Grateful Dead. Instead, he performed composed solos influenced by Television such as the one during the coda of "At Least That's What You Said". Tweedy refers to the guitar solo at the end of the track as a "musical transcription" of one of his panic attacks. A Ghost Is Born was recorded in a manner different from Foxtrot or 1999's Summerteeth; whereas those recordings were performed live in the studio and then extensively de-constructed and arranged in Pro Tools, A Ghost Is Born was first performed live, edited and arranged in Pro Tools, and then performed and re-recorded with minimal overdubbing. Tweedy was excited about writing an album this way:

An unusual feature of A Ghost Is Born is the fifteen-minute long track "Less Than You Think". The first part of the song begins as a ballad which references belief systems and atheism which after 3 minutes, fades out. The second part consists of electronic drones and noise, intended to audibly represent the migraines that lead singer Jeff Tweedy had been suffering from while addicted to pain killers during the recording sessions for A Ghost Is Born. For the song, each band member created a synthesizer noise that mimicked an electronic sound. The installations were simultaneously activated in the room and recorded. The noise, which served as the coda to the song, was remixed to provide dynamics to the track. Calling it "the track that everyone will hate," Tweedy defended the song's inclusion on the album:

A Ghost Is Born was the first Wilco album with pianist Mikael Jorgensen; he had previously worked as an engineer with the band on their collaboration with The Minus 5. Jeff Tweedy provided lead vocals and acted as lead guitarist for the only time since the band formed. John Stirratt, the only original member aside from Tweedy, played bass and guitar. Glenn Kotche and Jim O'Rourke, Tweedy's associates from Loose Fur, acted as drummer and multi-instrumentalist, respectively. Leroy Bach played a variety of keyboards as well as bass guitar. All members of the band contributed with a synthesizer part on "Less Than You Think".

Marketing and promotion
Wilco began touring in support of Ghost even before the album had been released. Multi-instrumentalist Leroy Bach left the band after the recording sessions to join a theater production, so Wilco added jazz rock guitarist Nels Cline and multi-instrumentalist Pat Sansone to replace him.Kot 2004. p. 243 Sansone had been playing with The Autumn Defense, a side project led by bassist John Stirratt. However, the tour to support the album had to be abridged. In May 2004, Tweedy checked himself into a rehabilitation clinic in Chicago, Illinois due to chronic migraine headaches, anxiety attacks, and clinical depression. In the process of treating the ailments, Tweedy became addicted to prescription painkillers. His rehab led to the cancellation of the European stage of the tour and a delay in the album's release date. Intended for release on June 8, 2004, the album was officially released on June 22, 2004.

The band also webcast the album in its entirety on the Internet in a promotion with Apple Computer. Nonesuch was willing to allow the MPEG-4 broadcast due to the success of a similar broadcast in the promotion of Yankee Hotel Foxtrot. Additionally, Wilco offered a free EP to purchasers of the album. The EP featured two outtakes from the album—"Panthers" and "Kicking Television"—and live versions of "At Least That's What You Said", "The Late Greats", and "Handshake Drugs". The EP was later packaged with the album and sold as a "deluxe version".

Reception

In its debut week, A Ghost Is Born peaked at number 8 on the Billboard 200 chart and sold over 81,000 copies, the highest US chart peak and best sales week ever attained by the band at that time. Last accessed July 27, 2007. The album was an international hit as well, peaking at number 24 in Norway, number 29 in Sweden, number 33 in New Zealand, number 34 in Belgium, and number 37 in Ireland. As of April 13, 2007, the album has sold over 340,000 copies in the United States, according to Nielsen SoundScan.

Like Foxtrot, A Ghost Is Born was well received by critics. On Metacritic, the album holds a score of 81 out of 100 from 33 critics, indicating "universal acclaim". Jon Pareles of Rolling Stone called A Ghost Is Born "as eerie as anything Wilco have recorded yet" and applauded Tweedy for offering "illuminating curiosity about what can happen in a song." Billboard cited it as Wilco's "most difficult and uncompromising album to date." Akiva Gottlieb of Stylus Magazine praised A Ghost Is Born as being "even more brilliant" than Yankee Hotel Foxtrot, a sentiment echoed by Michael Metevier of PopMatters, who added that the album made him "surprised and delighted enough to last several lifetimes." Keith Phipps of The A.V. Club wrote that A Ghost Is Born "channels its shaggy sound into pop music" that "constantly threatens to erupt into noise or fade into silence, but it's still hard not to hum along." James Hunter of The Village Voice felt that "Wilco's ideas are unremarkable, but are worked out with intelligence and striking conception. And as it happens, the new organic emphasis tables some of Wilco's lamer stylistic obsessions." Q called the album "more meandering" than Yankee Hotel Foxtrot, but also "more confident, more coherent, yielding an all-enveloping warmth that's entirely resistant to any iPod shuffle function."

Among mixed reviews, Rob Mitchum of Pitchfork criticized A Ghost Is Born as "wildly uneven" and "less cohesive than any other Wilco release." Village Voice critic Robert Christgau called it a "privileged self-indulgence" due to its extreme musical dynamics. NME wrote of the album: "It's like Scissor Sisters on tranquilisers. With a bit of ELO. And a dash of Ramones. And, with this eclecticism, a worrying lack of focus." Joshua Klein of the Chicago Tribune felt that the album possessed an "incomplete" quality which nonetheless can be "quite intriguing, more of a side step than a forward leap, but a worthy experiment all the same." Ann Powers of Blender wrote that on first listen, the album is "rather monotonous, a bunch of moderately singable tunes with some noise piled up around the edges", but that it "starts to insinuate meaning" over subsequent listens.

In 2005, A Ghost Is Born won two Grammy Awards for Best Alternative Music Album and Best Recording Package. Although the band was nominated for Grammys for work on previous albums, this was the first time that they won one. The band only won one award, as the winner for Best Recording Package is credited towards the artist of the artwork, not the performer.

Track listing
All songs written by Jeff Tweedy except where noted.US vinyl (8122-76492-1) /  standard US CD (7559-79809-2)Side one"At Least That's What You Said" – 5:33
"Hell Is Chrome" (Tweedy, Mikael Jorgensen) – 4:38
"Spiders (Kidsmoke)" – 10:46Side two"Muzzle of Bees" – 4:56
"Hummingbird" – 3:11
"Handshake Drugs" – 6:07Side three"Wishful Thinking" (Tweedy, Glenn Kotche) – 4:41
"Company in My Back" – 3:46
"I'm a Wheel" – 2:37
"Theologians" (Tweedy, Jorgensen, Chris Girard) – 3:36Side four"Less Than You Think" (Tweedy, John Stirratt, Kotche, Jorgensen, Leroy Bach, Jim O'Rourke) – 15:04
"The Late Greats" – 2:31Limited edition two-CD set (7559-79892-2)CD one"At Least That's What You Said" – 5:29
"Hell Is Chrome" – 4:33
"Spiders (Kidsmoke)" – 10:41
"Muzzle of Bees" – 4:51
"Hummingbird" – 3:06
"Handshake Drugs" – 6:02
"Wishful Thinking" – 4:37
"Company in My Back" – 3:42
"I'm a Wheel" – 2:33
"Theologians" – 3:31
"Less Than You Think" – 15:00
"The Late Greats" – 2:30CD two'
"Panthers" – 3:49
"At Least That's What You Said" (live) – 5:53
"The Late Greats" (live) – 2:39
"Handshake Drugs" (live) – 6:12
"Kicking Television" – 2:49

Singles
"I'm a Wheel" (July 26, 2004)
7-inch vinyl only, "I'm a Wheel" b/w "Kicking Television"

Personnel

Wilco 
Jeff Tweedy – vocals (all tracks), electric guitar (1–4, 6, 9, 10), acoustic baritone 12-string guitar (4, 7), acoustic guitar (6–8, 10, 12), acoustic 6-string bass, loops, filters, synths (11)
John Stirratt – bass (1, 3, 6–10, 12), electric guitar (2, 5), backing vocals (2–6), piano (4), acoustic guitar, loops, filters, synths (11)
Glenn Kotche – drums (all tracks), hammered dulcimer (8, 11), percussion (8), loops, filters, synths (11)
Leroy Bach – piano (1, 6, 8, 12), Korg CX-3 organ (2, 8), bass (4), vibes (7), electric guitar (9), acoustic guitar (10, 11), loops, filters, synths (11)
Mikael Jorgensen – synthesizer (1, 8, 11), piano (2–5, 7, 10, 12), Rocksichord (3, 6), Farfisa organ (4, 7, 12), Stylophone (8)

Additional musicians 
Jim O'Rourke – piano (1, 3, 4, 10), bass (2, 5), electric guitar (3, 5, 6, 12), ARP 2600 (3), acoustic guitar (4, 8), Korg CX-3 organ (7), loops, filters, synths (11)
Frankie Montuoro – hammered dulcimer (5)
Karen Waltuch – viola (5)
Tim Barnes – percussion (6)

Technical personnel 
Wilco – production
Jim O'Rourke – production, mixing, engineering, mixing
Chris Shaw – engineer
TJ Doherty – assistant engineer
Tim Iseler – assistant engineer
Mikael Jorgensen – engineer
Steve Rooke – mastering
Frankie Montuoro – production assistant, technical assistance
Stan Doty, Daniel Herbst, Deborah Miles Johnson, Haydn Johnston, Matt Zivich – production assistants, technical assistance
Dan Nadel – graphic design
Peter Buchanan-Smith – graphic design, photography
Mike Schmelling – photography
Gladys Nilsson – drawing
Ken Waagner – digital supervisor

Charts

Notes

References

External links
Link to downloadable EP with purchase of album

2004 albums
Nonesuch Records albums
Wilco albums
Grammy Award for Best Alternative Music Album
Albums produced by Jeff Tweedy
Albums produced by Jim O'Rourke (musician)